Yenokyan is an Armenian surname. Notable people with the surname include:

Edgar Yenokyan (born 1986), Armenian Freestyle wrestler
Harutyun Yenokyan (born 1985), Armenian Freestyle wrestler

Armenian-language surnames